"Gold" is a song by American musician Prince, his stage name at that time being an unpronounceable symbol, and was released as the third single from his seventeenth studio album, The Gold Experience (1995). Obviously proud of the song, Prince touted it as the next "Purple Rain" to reporters before the album's release. 

The B-side was "Rock 'n' Roll Is Alive (And It Lives in Minneapolis)", a response to the song "Rock and Roll Is Dead" by Lenny Kravitz. The song complements the rock-based "Gold" and features rousing guitar solos and live drumming as well as various studio tricks throughout the track. The chorus is a sample recorded from a live audience. Prince would later use the technique on several songs for The New Power Generation release Newpower Soul. Prince also made a special remix of the song called the "Tony Fly Mix" to be played on the local Minneapolis DJ's radio program. The remix remains unreleased.

A maxi single on CD and vinyl also included the extended remix of "I Hate U".

A limited edition gold CD single was released in the UK, housed in a gold jewel case. The track listing was the same as the standard CD single.

Critical reception
In an retrospective review, Andy Healy from Albumism stated that the song "is filled with uplift and hope despite the trials and tribulations it documents." He added, "It's The Artist's very own "Purple Rain" moment, if you will, with rousing chorus, powerful arrangement, soaring guitar solo and epic seven-plus-minute run time. It's also the track that fulfills a promise as it welcomes us to The Dawn." Upon the release, Gil L. Robertson from Cash Box named "Gold" a "standout track" of the Gold Experience album. Greg Kot from Chicago Tribune noted its "arena rock". James Masterton for Dotmusic declared it as "a classic single", saying, "For all his self-indulgence on records, when he wants to pull the ace from up his sleeve he does so in style and "Gold" is almost certainly destined to go down as a classic Prince record." Alexis Petridis from The Guardian found that it "reiterates the anti-materialistic message of 1992's "Money Don't Matter 2 Night". It's not groundbreaking in the way Prince's singles once were, but it's exquisitely written." Chuck Campbell from Knoxville News Sentinel viewed it as "familiar-sounding" and "religiously overtoned".

Chart performance
The song achieved little initial success in the US, with minor Mainstream radio play and no R&B/Hip-Hop or Rhythmic radio play, and weak sales. It peaked at number 88 and stayed on the Hot 100 for two weeks. The single was far more successful in the United Kingdom, where it reached number 10 and became Prince's last original top-ten hit there .

Music video
A music video was produced to promote the single, directed by Prince himself. It was later published on Prince's official YouTube channel in October 2017. The video has amassed more than 5.2 million views as of July 2022.

Charts

References

Prince (musician) songs
1990s ballads
1995 singles
Songs written by Prince (musician)
Pop ballads
Rock ballads
NPG Records singles
Warner Records singles
Song recordings produced by Prince (musician)